The Seventh Cross is a 1944 American drama film, set in Nazi Germany, starring Spencer Tracy as a prisoner who escaped from a concentration camp. The story chronicles how he interacts with ordinary Germans, and gradually sheds his cynical view of humanity.

The film co-starred Hume Cronyn, who was nominated for the Oscar for Best Supporting Actor. It was the first film in which Cronyn appeared with his wife Jessica Tandy, and was among the first feature films directed by Fred Zinnemann; it was his first hit movie.

The movie was adapted from the 1942 novel of the same name by the German refugee writer Anna Seghers. Produced in the midst of the Second World War, it was one of the few films made during the war to deal with the existence of Nazi concentration camps.

Plot
In 1936 in Germany, seven prisoners escape from the fictitious Westhofen concentration camp (partly based on the real Osthofen concentration camp) near the Rhine. The escapees are: a writer, a circus performer, a schoolmaster, a farmer, a Jewish grocery clerk, George Heisler (Spencer Tracy) and his friend Wallau (Ray Collins).

The camp commandant erects a row of seven crosses and vows to "put a man on each." The first to be apprehended is Wallau, who dies without giving up any information. With the dead Wallau narrating, the film follows Heisler as he makes his way across the German countryside, stealing a jacket to cover his prison garb. The Nazis round up other escaped prisoners, where they are returned to the camp and hung on crosses, suspended by their arms tied behind their backs. Through it all, the local population seems largely indifferent.

Heisler travels to his home city Frankfurt, where his former girlfriend, Leni (Kaaren Verne) resides. She had promised to wait for him, but she has since married and refuses to help. He is given a suit of clothes by Mme. Marelli (Agnes Moorehead). Nearby, another of the escapees, the acrobat, leaps to his death to avoid being captured. With Heisler's options further limited, he goes to an old friend, Paul Roeder (Hume Cronyn). Though Roeder is a factory worker with a wife (Jessica Tandy) and young children, he still risks all to help Heisler. Roeder gets in touch with the German underground, whose members risk their lives to help Heisler escape Germany. Through his exposure to this courage and kindness, and with the help toward the end of a sympathetic waitress (Signe Hasso), Heisler regains his faith in humanity. He escapes via boat to an unknown destination that he identifies as "probably Holland."

Cast

 Spencer Tracy as George Heisler
 Signe Hasso as Toni 
 Hume Cronyn as Paul Roeder
 Jessica Tandy as Liesel Roeder
 Agnes Moorehead as Madame Marelli
 Herbert Rudley as Franz Marnet
 Felix Bressart as Poldi Schlamm
 Ray Collins as Ernst Wallau / narrator
 Alexander Granach as Zillich
 Katherine Locke as Frau Hedy Sauer
 George Macready as Bruno Sauer
 Paul Guilfoyle as Fiedler
 Stephen Geray as Dr. Loewenstein
 Kurt Katch as Leo Hermann 
 Kaaren Verne as Leni
 Konstantin Shayne as Fuellgrabe, a writer
 George Suzanne as Bellani, an acrobat
 John Wengraf as Overkamp
 George Zucco as Fahrenburg
 Steven Muller as Hellwig
 Eily Malyon as Fraulein Bachmann
 Lisa Golm as Frau Hinkel
 James Dime as a prisoner in a concentration camp

Production 
Anna Seghers, the author of the novel from which this movie was adapted, was a Communist, and Wallau and Heisler were Communists in the book. In Helen Deutsch's script, their political affiliation is not given. The political thrust of the film is thus about the anti-Fascist German resistance. Refugees from Nazi Germany played many small roles, with the small uncredited bit part of a janitor played by Helene Weigel, the prominent German actress and wife of Bertolt Brecht. Hugh Beaumont has an uncredited role as a truck driver.

MGM publicity played up the fleeting romantic element between Tracy's character and that of the Swedish actress, Signe Hasso, with the tagline: "The revealing novel of a hunted man's search for love!"

Box office
According to MGM records, the film earned $2,082,000 in the US and Canada and $1,489,000 elsewhere resulting in a profit of $1,021,000.

Award
Hume Cronyn received an Academy Award nomination as Actor in a Supporting Role for his performance as Paul Roeder.

References

External links 
 
 
 
 
 

1944 films
American black-and-white films
American drama films
Films scored by Roy Webb
Films directed by Fred Zinnemann
Films based on German novels
Films about the German Resistance
Films set in 1936
Films set in Germany
Metro-Goldwyn-Mayer films
1944 drama films
1940s American films
1940s English-language films